National Highways of Pakistan are a network of toll highways in Pakistan, which are owned, maintained and operated by the National Highways Authority under the Ministry of Communications. It maintains  of roadways organized into various classifications which crisscross the country and provide access to major population centers. National Highways are not to be confused with provincial highways, which are roads maintained by the respective provinces. Pakistan's national highways include the famous Grand Trunk Road, Indus Highway, Karakoram Highway and Makran Coastal Highway. All national highways in Pakistan are pre-fixed with the letter 'N' (for "national") followed by the unique numerical designation of the specific highway (with a hyphen in the middle), e.g. "N-5". Each numerical designation is separated by five numerals, i.e. N-5, N-10, N-15, etc. National Highways are distinct from Strategic Highways, which begin with the prefix 'S' and are controlled and operated by the Ministry of Defence.

National Highway Network Map

List of National Highways

List of Provincial Highways

Gilgit-Baltistan

 Provincial Highways of Gilgit-Baltistan

Khyber Pakhtunkhwa
 Provincial Highways of Khyber Pakhtunkhwa

Punjab
 Provincial Highways of Punjab

Sindh
 Provincial Highways of Sindh

List of Strategic Highways

See also

 Roads in Pakistan
 National Highway Authority
 Speed limits in Pakistan
 Motorways of Pakistan

External links 
 National Highway Authority

Highways in Pakistan